Pay to Stay was the name of a government policy in the United Kingdom whereby council tenants earning £30,000 (£40,000 in London) would have to pay "market or near market rents". The measure was due to come into effect in April 2017 with the Institute for Fiscal Studies estimating that the policy will impact upon 10% of social housing tenants. On 21 November 2016 the Housing Minister Gavin Barwell announced that the new plans for Pay to Stay would be dropped. Councils maintain the option of charging near market rates to those on incomes of £60,000 or more.

Criticism
The trade publication Inside Housing has criticised the practicality of the policy given that social landlords do not currently have a mechanism to compel tenants to declare their incomes.

Other criticisms of the policy are that it may decrease the total social housing stock by encouraging people to exercise their right to buy and the policy may also disincentivize work if higher earnings will result in a higher rent bill.

The Pay To Stay policy has also been criticised as a "tax on aspiration". It is argued that workers nearing the threshold may reduce their hours to compensate for a pay rises. It is unclear if a bonus or overtime would be considered, in the accessing of the excess rent to pay by the tenant.

The 2016–2017 tax year is the period that wages will be accessed, to determine the excess payment. It has been suggested that a taper may be used, but there is no information as to how this will operate.

A taper, for example, may work with every pound earned over the relevant threshold being billed at say 50p. If the market rent were deemed £4,000 more than the current rent a year for the tenant, and that tenant earns £31,000 (outside London) they would pay £500 extra rental a year towards that market rent. This would increase with each pound until the £4,000 "shortfall" is met. This tenant would have to earn £38,000 before they stopped having their rent increased.

See also
Under-occupancy penalty

References

External links
House of Commons briefing note

Housing in the United Kingdom